Robert Christgau (born 1942) is an American essayist and music critic.

Christgau may also refer to:

People
 John Christgau (1934-2018), American author and basketball coach
 Victor Christgau (1894-1991), American politician from Minnesota

Books
 Christgau's Record Guide: Rock Albums of the Seventies, a music reference book by Robert Christgau
 Christgau's Record Guide: The '80s, the second book in the series
 Christgau's Consumer Guide: Albums of the '90s, the third book in the series